Chinatown, California may refer to:

Chinatown, Los Angeles, California
Chinatown, Oakland, California
Chinatown, San Francisco, California
Chinatown, San Jose, California